Nebria yunnana is a species of black and orange coloured ground beetle in the Nebriinae subfamily that is endemic to Yunnan, province of China.

References

yunnana
Beetles described in 1928
Beetles of Asia
Endemic fauna of Yunnan